GEAB may  refer to:

 GE-AB, the ISO code for Abkhazia
 Global European Anticipation Bulletin, an organ of the Leap2020
 Goliath F-GEAB, a variant of the Farman F.60 Goliath airplane